The Thirtieth Wisconsin Legislature convened from  to  in regular session.

This was the first legislative session after the redistricting of the Senate and Assembly according to an act of the previous session.

Senators representing odd-numbered districts were newly elected for this session and were serving the first year of a two-year term. Assembly members were elected to a one-year term. Assembly members and odd-numbered senators were elected in the general election of November 7, 1876. Senators representing even-numbered districts were serving the second year of their two-year term, having been elected in the general election held on November 2, 1875.

Major events
 January 29, 1877: President Ulysses S. Grant signed the Electoral Commission Act to attempt to settle the disputed 1876 United States presidential election.  
 March 2, 1877: The Compromise of 1877 secured the election of Rutherford B. Hayes, resolving the disputed 1876 United States presidential election.
 March 4, 1877: Inauguration of Rutherford B. Hayes as the 19th President of the United States.
 May 6, 1877: Chief Crazy Horse of the Oglala Sioux surrendered to United States troops in Nebraska.
 July 16, 1877: The Great Railroad Strike of 1877 lead to rioting in Baltimore, Pittsburgh, and St. Louis.
 September 5, 1877: While in captivity, Chief Crazy Horse was killed by an American soldier.
 November 6, 1877: William E. Smith elected Governor of Wisconsin.
 November 29, 1877: Thomas Edison demonstrated his phonograph for the first time.

Major legislation
 January 31, 1877: Joint Resolution agreeing to an amendment of section four of article seven of the constitution of the state of Wisconsin, 1877 Joint Resolution 1.  Confirmed a constitutional amendment adding two seats to the Wisconsin Supreme Court, to be chosen at the Spring 1878 election.
 February 16, 1877: Joint Resolution relating to the coinage of silver, 1877 Act 3.

Party summary

Senate summary

Assembly summary

Sessions
 1st Regular session: January 10, 1877March 8, 1877

Leaders

Senate leadership
 President of the Senate: Charles D. Parker (D)
 President pro tempore: William Hiner (R)

Assembly leadership
 Speaker of the Assembly: John B. Cassoday

Members

Members of the Senate
Members of the Senate for the Thirtieth Wisconsin Legislature:

Members of the Assembly
Members of the Assembly for the Thirtieth Wisconsin Legislature:

Changes from the 29th Legislature
New districts for the 30th Legislature were defined in 1876 Wisconsin Act 343, passed into law in the 29th Wisconsin Legislature.

Senate redistricting

Summary of changes
 10 Senate districts were left unchanged (or were only renumbered).
 Brown County became its own senate district (2), after previously having been in a shared district with Door and Kewaunee counties.
 The Dane County district boundaries were slightly redrawn and renumbered (25, 26).
 Milwaukee County went from having 2 districts to 3 (5, 6, 7).
 Green and Lafayette counties were combined into one district (12).
 Fond du Lac County's eastern district was combined with Manitowoc County as one district (20).
 Pierce County was removed from the 24th district and added to a new district with Eau Claire and Dunn counties (30).

Senate districts

Assembly redistricting

Summary of changes
 45 Assembly districts were left unchanged (or were only renumbered).
 Adams County became its own Assembly district, after previously having been in a shared district with Wood County.
 Chippewa County became its own Assembly district, after previously having been in a shared district with Taylor County.
 Columbia County went from having 3 districts to 2.
 Dane County went from having 4 districts to 3.
 Dodge County went from having 6 districts to 4.
 Door County became its own Assembly district, after previously having been in a shared district with Northern Kewaunee County.
 Dunn County became its own Assembly district, after previously having been in a shared district with Pepin County.
 Juneau County went from having 1 district to 2.
 Ozaukee County went from having 2 districts to 1.
 Rock County went from having 5 districts to 3.

Assembly districts

References

External links
 1877: Related Documents from Wisconsin Legislature

1877 in Wisconsin
Wisconsin
Wisconsin legislative sessions